Nothing to Lose is the second studio album by German recording artist Daniel Schuhmacher. A breakaway from his debut album, it was released by independent label 313 Music on September 17, 2010 in German-speaking Europe.

Track listing

Charts

Weekly charts

References

External links
  
 

2010 albums
Daniel Schuhmacher albums